Robert Allen Gassoff (April 17, 1953 – May 29, 1977) was a professional ice hockey player, born in Quesnel, British Columbia. From an early age he was passionate about hockey, playing first on a rink on the family farm on the Quesnel Hydraulic Road and then on a variety of local junior leagues. He played four seasons in the NHL for the St. Louis Blues. He was killed in a motorcycle accident on the country property of his friend and teammate Garry Unger near Gray Summit, Missouri; his number three was subsequently retired by the Blues.

Motorcycle accident
Gassoff was killed in a motorcycle accident on the Sunday of Memorial Day weekend in 1977. He and his pregnant wife, Diane, had been invited to a postseason barbecue at teammate Garry Unger's  farm near Gray Summit, Mo. At roughly 6:00 p.m., Gassoff joined several others in riding motorcycles around Unger's property. Unger later said that he remembered wondering if it was a good idea for Gassoff to ride the motorcycle because he had been drinking and did not have any riding experience. Gassoff drove out of Unger's property on a gravel road that merged into a winding road leading up a hill to Villa Ridge, Missouri. Gassoff was not wearing a helmet and had no license plate on his motorcycle and decided to take a short run up the hill and come right back. On his way back down the hill, he collided head-on with a car driven by a man named Douglas Klekamp. The crash killed Gassoff, and Klekamp walked away uninjured. In October 1977, Gassoff's widow filed a $3 million lawsuit against Unger, his wife, and Klekamp, whom the suit alleged was one of Unger's employees running an errand for the Ungers. Unger describes Gassoff's death as one of the most devastating moments of his life.

Family 
Gassoff's parents, Albert and Denise, were staunch supporter of his interest in hockey and encouraged him from a very early age.  Gassoff's brother, Brad, was also an NHL hockey player. His brother Ken, born October 9, 1954, was drafted by the New York Rangers in the 1974 NHL amateur draft and by the Houston Aeros in the 1974 WHA Amateur Draft. Gassoff's son Bob Gassoff Jr. (born two months after the fatal motorcycle accident in 1977) eventually also became a hockey player, briefly playing minor league professional hockey for the Peoria Rivermen (ECHL) after a four year college hockey career with the University of Michigan Wolverines men's ice hockey team. He became a Navy SEAL after retiring from hockey.

Tributes 
Following his death, the Bob Gassoff Trophy was created to be presented annually to the most improved defenseman in the Central Hockey League (CHL).

Career statistics

Regular season and playoffs

See also
List of ice hockey players who died during their playing career

References

External links
 
 Story of his accident
 

1953 births
1977 deaths
Canadian ice hockey defencemen
Cariboo people
Denver Spurs players
Ice hockey people from British Columbia
Medicine Hat Tigers players
Minnesota Fighting Saints draft picks
Motorcycle road incident deaths
National Hockey League players with retired numbers
Road incident deaths in Missouri
St. Louis Blues draft picks
St. Louis Blues players
Vernon Vikings players